Little Head was singer-songwriter John Hiatt's fourteenth album, released in 1997.  It failed to hit the top half of the Billboard 200, and it was his last album with Capitol Records.

Track listing
All tracks written by John Hiatt except where noted

"Little Head" – 3:45
"Pirate Radio" – 4:27
"My Sweet Girl" – 4:04
"Feelin' Again" – 3:45
"Graduated" – 4:38
"Sure Pinocchio" – 4:16 (Hiatt, David Faragher)
"Runaway" – 5:53
"Woman Sawed in Half" – 4:31
"Far As We Go" – 4:15
"After All This Time" – 3:24

Personnel
John Hiatt – guitar, vocals, piano
Davey Faragher – bass guitar, vocals
David Immerglück – guitar, pedal steel guitar, Dobro, electric sitar, vocals
Gary Ferguson – drums, vocals
Peter Holsapple – piano, organ
Efrain Toro – percussion, vocals
Additional musicians
 Jon Brion - vibraphone, Chamberlin
 Kevin Buck - cello
 Emilio Castillo - tenor saxophone
 Bill Churchville - trumpet, flugelhorn
 Barry Danielian - trumpet, flugelhorn
 Matt Ferguson - vocals
 Jim Gilstrap - vocals
 Bob Joyce - vocals
 Stephen "Doc" Kupka - baritone saxophone
 Jean McClain - vocals
 Laura Creamer - vocals
 John Scarpulla - tenor saxophone, alto saxophone, flute
 Jeff Scornavacca - vocals
 Benmont Tench - organ
 Michael Urbano - drums
 Billy Valentine - vocals

References

External links

1997 albums
John Hiatt albums
Capitol Records albums